Meteg (or meseg or metheg, Hebrew: , lit. 'bridle', also  , lit. 'bellowing', or  ) is a punctuation mark used in Biblical Hebrew  for stress marking. It is a vertical bar placed under the affected syllable.

Usage 

Meteg is primarily used in Biblical Hebrew to mark secondary stress and vowel length.

Meteg is also sometimes used in Biblical Hebrew to mark a long vowel. While short and long vowels are largely allophonic, they are not always predictable from spelling, e.g.  'and they saw' vs.  'and they feared'. Meteg's indication of length also indirectly indicates that a following shva is vocal, as in the previous case. This may distinguish qamatz gadol and qatan, e.g.  'she guarded' vs.  'guard (volitive)'.

In modern usage meteg is only used in liturgical contexts and dictionaries. Siddurim and dictionaries may use meteg to mark primary stress, often only for non-final stress, since the majority of Hebrew words have final stress.

Appearance and placement 
Its form is a vertical bar placed either to the left, the right, or in the middle of the niqqud (diacritics for vowels or cantillation) under a consonant. It is identical in appearance to silluq and is unified with it in Unicode.

Meteg differs from other Hebrew diacritics in that its placement is not totally fixed. While meteg is usually placed to the left of a vowel, some texts place it to the right, and some place it in the middle of hataf vowels. The Rabbinic Bible of 1524–25 always shifts meteg to the left, while the Aleppo and Leningrad codices are not consistent in meteg placement.

The different placements of meteg are subgrouped relatively to its order with surrounding vowel points occurring below letters before or after it and are summarized in the table below. Three types of metegs are generally considered, with the left meteg being the most common case for simple vowels (however there's some rare cases where this group must be subdivided according to the placement of cantillation accents), and the medial meteg occurring only (but most frequently) with (composite) hataf vowels.

Note finally that under narrow letters (such as nun) with vowel points below, or under letters that are also surrounded by multiple vowel points or cantillation accents below them, the meteg may not fit well on any side of the vowel point below the base letter. In that case the meteg may adopt an ambiguous position, below the existing vowel point or above the cantillation accent that normally fits below the base letter. Such ambiguous positioning occurs in old books like the Codex Leningradensis (around year 1006) whose text on paper was extremely compacted with minimal spacing between letters.

Unicode 
In Unicode, Meteg and Silluq (when it occurs before punctuation Sof passuk at end of verses) are unified.

Unicode also does not distinguish between the different placements of Meteg. And because Meteg has a distinctive combining class, its encoding order relative to other diacritics is not significant (because of canonical equivalence). Consequently, the Meteg may be freely reordered during Unicode normalization when it appears in sequences with other combining diacritics, without affecting its interpretation or rendering.

Where the relative placement of Meteg is significant and does not match the standard order of combining classes of Hebrew diacritics (where the Meteg should appear after Hebrew vowel points but before Hebrew cantillation marks in normalized texts), a combining grapheme joiner (CGJ, U+034F) should be added between Meteg and other diacritics before or after it, to fix its rendering placement and intended meaning.

In the most frequent use of Meteg, it should follow the vowel mark, but the canonical ordering of combining classes swaps them during standard normalizations: the canonical combining class of Meteg is 22, higher than the canonical combining classes 10 to 20 assigned to Hebrew vowel points; it is also higher than the canonical combining class 21 assigned to the combining Dagesh (or Mapiq) consonant modifier, but this generally causes no problem.

In the most frequent cases of use in modern Hebrew, the Meteg should only follow a vowel point and cantillation marks are not used; but in Biblical Hebrew it must sometimes be encoded with an additional CGJ after it before a vowel point, so that it remains interpreted first (and rendered to the right) before the niqqud after it (to the left); Meteg must also be preceded by a CGJ if it must appear after (to the left) a cantillation accent (whose combining class is 220 or more).

Additionally, the special placements of meteg with the three hataf vowels (whose canonical combinal classes are between 11 and 13) requires encoding it after the hataf vowel point, separated by a zero-width joiner control (ZWJ, U+200D) for the medial position (between the two parts of the hataf vowel), or by a zero-width non-joiner control (ZWNJ, U+200C) for the final position (to the left of the hataf vowel); some encoded texts use CGJ instead of ZWNJ for the later case.

The three controls CGJ, ZWJ and ZWNJ (which have canonical combining class 0) are all blocking the canonical reordering of meteg with vowels points, and only ZWJ is needed for the special placement of meteg (combining class) in the middle of an hataf vowel. But in the cases where the encoding of CGJ is optional but not needed, or for the case where ZWNJ is replaced by CGJ, the presence or absence of this CGJ control creates texts that are not visually distinctive, but they are still not canonically equivalent. This may create difficulties for plain-text search, unless it uses a conforming Unicode collation algorithm (UCA) with the appropriate tailoring for the Hebrew script, where these controls are assigned ignorable weights after the initial normalization.

References

External links 
 
 Normalization for Biblical Hebrew

Hebrew alphabet
Punctuation